Barry Hynes (born c. 1945) was a Canadian politician. He represented the electoral district of Trinity North in the Newfoundland and Labrador House of Assembly from 1989 to 1991. He was a member of the Progressive Conservative Party of Newfoundland and Labrador. He resigned on December 3, 1990 after being convicted of sexual assault.

References

1940s births
Living people
Progressive Conservative Party of Newfoundland and Labrador MHAs
Canadian politicians convicted of crimes
Politicians convicted of sex offences